Nuritdin Akramovich Mukhitdinov (– 27 August 2008) was a Soviet politician. Between 1957 and 1961 he was a member of the Presidium of the Central Committee of the Communist Party of the Soviet Union, significantly contributing to its relations with the Soviet republics and foreign countries in Asia. He was also the Soviet ambassador to Syria between 1968 and 1977.

Biography
Mukhitdinov was born in the village Allan near Tashkent in a family of Uzbek farmers. After finishing an Uzbek-language school, in 1934 he was sent to the University of Trade in Moscow. He graduated in 1938 and worked in the Communist Party system, first at a factory in Bukhara, Uzbekistan, and then with the Soviet Army in Ukraine. During World War II he participated in combat and was wounded at the Battle of Stalingrad. He was demobilized in 1946 to assume various party posts in Uzbekistan. In 1948 he became a member of the Central Committee of the Communist Party and the next year was awarded the Order of Lenin. His party career became volatile in the 1950s. Mukhitdinov was officially reprimanded three times in 1951 by Joseph Stalin for poor management of cotton collection in Uzbekistan; nevertheless, in 1953, Stalin recommended him for election to the Central Committee of the Communist Party. Later in the same year, after the death of Stalin, Mukhitdinov was demoted under pressure from Lavrentiy Beria from the post of the Chairman of the Council of Ministers of Uzbekistan.

His career rose after the removal of Beria in December 1953. Mukhitdinov was reinstated as Chairman of the Council of Ministers of Uzbekistan and was First Secretary of the Uzbek Central Committee of the Communist Party from 1955 to 1957. He opposed the attempted demotion of Nikita Khrushchev in 1957, and in return, Khrushchev recommended him to the Presidium, where he was the Secretary responsible for Central Asia. However, by the end of the 1950s, Mukhitdinov developed strong disagreements on planning policies with leading party members such as Mikhail Suslov, Anastas Mikoyan, Frol Kozlov, and later with Khrushchev himself. For example, Mukhitdinov opposed the proposal by Khrushchev to remove the remains of Stalin from the Mausoleum. As a consequence, in 1961 he was demoted from the Presidium and was on the verge of expulsion from the Central Committee, and only his popularity in the native Uzbekistan spared his Party career. He retained his international activities and in 1968-1977 served as the ambassador to Syria, eventually receiving the Order of Friendship. After retirement in 1985 he returned to native Tashkent, where he worked as a government adviser, wrote several books, and died in 2008.

References
https://sites.google.com/view/nuritdin-mukhitdinov/

1917 births
2008 deaths
People from Tashkent Region
Soviet military personnel of World War II
Soviet politicians
First Secretaries of the Communist Party of Uzbekistan
Central Committee of the Communist Party of the Soviet Union members
Ambassadors of the Soviet Union to Syria
Recipients of the Order of Lenin
Recipients of the Order of Friendship of Peoples
Third convocation members of the Supreme Soviet of the Soviet Union
Fourth convocation members of the Supreme Soviet of the Soviet Union
Fifth convocation members of the Supreme Soviet of the Soviet Union
Heads of government of the Uzbek Soviet Socialist Republic